Hypenagonia vexataria is a moth of the family Erebidae first described by Francis Walker in 1861. It is found in Borneo and probably in Sri Lanka,

References

Moths of Asia
Moths described in 1861
Boletobiinae